Telenassa is a genus of butterflies of the family Nymphalidae found in South America.

Species
Listed alphabetically:
 Telenassa abas (Hewitson, 1864)
 Telenassa berenice (C. & R. Felder, 1862) – narrow-banded crescent
 Telenassa delphia (C. & R. Felder, 1861) – Delphia crescent
 Telenassa fontus (Hall, 1928) – Fontus crescent
 Telenassa jana (C. & R. Felder, [1867]) – Jana crescent
 Telenassa notus (Hall, 1917) – Notus crescent
 Telenassa sepultus (Hall, 1928)
 Telenassa teletusa (Godart, [1824]) – Burchell's crescent

References

Melitaeini
Nymphalidae of South America
Butterfly genera
Taxa named by Robert P. Higgins